Al-Hussein Bin Talal University (AHU) (Arabic جامعة الحسين بن طلال) is a public coeducational university located in the heart of the southern region, 210 km from the Capital Amman.about 9 km to the northwest of Ma'an city in the southern region of Jordan.  It was established by a Royal Decree on April 28, 1999. AHU is a comprehensive public university in a self-contained campus, and has student population representing nearly every Governorate in Jordan. over the past years, AHU has grown to eight colleges offering bachelor's degree programs in natural and environmental sciences, business, nursing, education, humanities, IT and engineering; and two Deanships, the Deanship of Student Affairs and the Deanship of Scientific Research. AHU has nine scientific centers that are heavily engaged in research and development projects to serve local and national communities.

History
Al-Hussein Bin Talal University was founded in 1999 and was the first higher educational institute established during the reign of H.M. King Abdullah II. At the beginning, the university was a branch for Mu’tah University occupying a temporary campus in the city of Ma’an and was relocated to a permanent campus in September 2004, 9 km North West of the city of Ma’an. The University was established in 1999 as a branch of Mutah University., it was the first higher education institute to be founded during the reign of King Abdullah II.

Academics
The university offers degrees in 9 colleges:
 College of Arts
 College of Science
 College of Information Technology
 College of Engineering 
 College of Business Administration and Economics
 College of Education
 College of Mining and Environmental Engineering
 Petra College for Tourism and Archaeology 
 Princess Aisha Bint Al-Hussein Faculty of Nursing

References

External links 
 Official site

Hussein
Educational institutions established in 1999
Ma'an Governorate
1999 establishments in Jordan